George Pope Morris (October 10, 1802 – July 6, 1864) was an American editor, poet, and songwriter.

Life and work
With Nathaniel Parker Willis, he co-founded the daily New York Evening Mirror by merging his fledgling weekly New-York Mirror with Willis's American Monthly in August 1831. Morris is credited with the longevity the Evening Mirror would enjoy and for giving it a wide scope, covering not only news and entertainment but reviews of the fine arts, editorials, and many original engravings. Morris also funded in advance Willis's trip to Europe, for which Willis wrote several letters to be published in the Mirror, which helped establish his fame. On January 29, 1845, the Evening Mirror published an "advance copy" of Edgar Allan Poe's "The Raven". It was the first publication of that poem with the author's name. The publishing partners also issued an anthology called The Prose and Poetry of America in 1845.

Willis and Morris left the Mirror in 1846 and founded a new weekly, the National Press, which was renamed the Home Journal after eight months. Beginning in 1854 his son William, who had graduated from the United States Military Academy in 1851, resigned from the Army and worked for the newspaper as an editor. Beginning in 1901, it was published as Town and Country and is still in print under that title today. Their prospectus for the publication, published November 21, 1846, announced their intentions to create a magazine "to circle around the family table".

In addition to his publishing and editorial work, Morris was popular as a poet and songwriter; especially well-known was his poem-turned-song "Woodman, Spare that Tree!" His songs in particular were popular enough that Graham's Magazine in Philadelphia promised Morris $50, sight unseen, for any work he wanted to publish in the periodical. "Woodman, Spare that Tree!" was first published in the January 17, 1837, issue of the Mirror under the title "The Oak" and was that year set to music by Henry Russell before being reprinted under its more common title in 1853. Lines from the poem are often quoted by environmentalists. The poem was also included in one of Morris's volumes of collected poems, The Deserted Bride and Other Poems, 1838, which ran into several editions.

Morris was friends with artist Robert Walter Weir to whom he dedicated his only book of prose, The Little Frenchman and His Water Lots (1839). A collection of short stories and sketches, the little Frenchman of the title story was the victim of an unscrupulous dealer in real estate bordering Wallabout Bay, that was under water at high tide.

Morris died July 6, 1864. Horace Binney Wallace wrote the introductory biographical notice for Morris's posthumous collected works.

Critical response
Critic and writer Edgar Allan Poe acknowledged the popularity of Morris's songs, "which have taken fast hold upon the popular taste, and which are deservedly celebrated". In April 1840, Poe wrote that Morris was "very decidedly, our best writer of songs—and, in saying this, I mean to assign him a high rank as poet". Willis wrote of Morris: "He is just what poets would be if they sang like birds without criticism... nothing can stop a song of his".

Morris was one of several poets who were gently mocked by Bayard Taylor in his 1876 verse parody The Echo Club and Other Literary Diversions.

Bibliography
The Deserted Bride and Other Poems (1838)
The Little Frenchman and His Water Lots (1839)

References

External links

 
 
 
1843 issue of The New Mirror edited by G. P. Morris and N. P. Willis, at Google Book Search
"Woodman, Spare That Tree!": the first American environmental protest song?
 The Deserted Bride and Other Poems by George P. Morris (1843), at Google Book Search
George Pope Morris Collection at the New York Public Library
Information on George Pope Morris from the University of Virginia
Derek B Scott sings Henry Russell's 1837 setting of “Woodman, Spare That Tree"
Songs on IMSLP

American newspaper publishers (people)
American male poets
American editors
American male songwriters
People from Philadelphia
1802 births
1864 deaths
19th-century American businesspeople
19th-century American male musicians